Channel A is a Japanese musical variety show produced by Avex and East and Television Kanagawa.

History

 (stylized as channel a) started on October 1, 1998 at 10:00 pm as a 54-minute show. Hosted by Ryo Fukawa and Mika Mifune, it promised a change on Japanese TV programming through segments and documentaries about music, artists, songs and everything about music and entertainment.

The program lasted for three seasons:
 Season 1 - October 1, 1998 - May 6, 2004
 Season 2 - May 13, 2004 - March 29, 2007
 Season 3 - April 5, 2007 - September 24, 2009

Its last episode (573rd) was on September 24, 2009.

Special episode
A special episode for Channel A's 10th anniversary,  was shown last September 3, 2009.

Other
Because it is produced by Avex Group, Channel A is always interspersed with television commercials (TVCM) from the company.

Segments
 Featuring A - variety corner
 A's Nude - special documentaries
 A-News - Introduction to new features in music
  - Countdown on the top 20 most popular ringtones in Japan. (Presented by mu-mo, Avex Group's online music store.)
 A Interrogation Room
 A-Poll
 V.I.P. Room

Stations
This is a list of stations where Channel A was telecast.

Outside Japan
 Macau - Macau Asia Satellite Television

See also
 Avex Group

External links
 
 
 

1998 Japanese television series debuts
2009 Japanese television series endings
Avex Group
Japanese music television series